Following are the results of the Women's synchronized 10 metre platform event at the 2009 World Aquatics Championships held in Rome, Italy, from July 17 to August 2, 2009.

Results

Green denotes finalists

External links
Preliminary Results
Final Results

Diving at the 2009 World Aquatics Championships
Aqua